Archachatina knorri is a species of large air-breathing land snail, a terrestrial pulmonate gastropod mollusk in the family Achatinidae. 
This species is endemic to Liberia.

References 

Achatinidae
Invertebrates of West Africa
Endemic fauna of Liberia
Gastropods described in 1839
Taxonomy articles created by Polbot